Lonicera caerulea, also known by its common names blue honeysuckle, sweetberry honeysuckle, fly honeysuckle (blue fly honeysuckle),  blue-berried honeysuckle, or the honeyberry, is a non-climbing honeysuckle native throughout the cool temperate Northern Hemisphere regions of North America, Europe, and Asia.

The plant or its fruit has also come to be called haskap, derived from its name in the language of the native Ainu people of Hokkaido, Japan.

Description
The flowers are yellowish-white, 12–16 mm long, with five equal lobes; they are produced in pairs on the shoots.

The plant is winter-hardy and can tolerate temperatures below . Its flowers are frost-tolerant. Fruits mature early and are high in vitamin C. Each berry has approximately 20 edible seeds that resemble tomato seeds based on their size and shape, but the seeds are not noticeable during chewing.

Haskap cultivars can survive a large range of soil acidity from 3.9-7.7 (optimum 5.5-6.5), requiring high organic matter, well drained soils, and plentiful sunlight for optimum productivity. Lonicera caerulea plants are more tolerant of wet conditions than most fruit species.

Distribution and habitat
The species is circumpolar, primarily found in or near wetlands of boreal forests in heavy peat soils of North America, Europe, and Asia. It also can be found in high-calcium soils, in mountains, and along the coasts of northeastern Asia and northwestern North America.

Different varieties are distributed across central and northern Canada, northern United States, northern and eastern Europe, Siberia, middle Asia, and northeastern China.

Classification

The classification within the species is not settled. One classification uses nine botanical varieties:
Lonicera caerulea var. altaica. Northern Asia.
Lonicera caerulea var. caerulea. Europe.
Lonicera caerulea var. cauriana. Western North America.
Lonicera caerulea var. dependens. Central Asia.
Lonicera caerulea var. edulis, synonym: L. edulis. Eastern Asia. 
Lonicera caerulea var. emphyllocalyx (also known as haskap). Eastern Asia.
Lonicera caerulea var. kamtschatica. Northeastern Asia.
Lonicera caerulea var. pallasii. Northern Asia, northeastern Europe.
Lonicera caerulea var. villosa. Eastern North America.

Cultivated varieties
Improved cultivars include:
 'Aurora'
 'Boreal Beauty'
 'Boreal Beast'
 'Boreal Blizzard'
 'Honeybee'
 'Wojtek'
 'Berry Blue'
 'Indigo Gem'
 'Indigo Treat'
 'Indigo Yum'
 'Tundra'
 'Borealis'
 'Atlaj'
 'Nimfa'
 'Polar Jewel'

According to research at the University of Saskatchewan, each variety can be distinguished by the size of berries, taste, and bush dimensions.

Common names
Lonicera caerulea is known by several common names:

 Haskap: name of the Ainu language in northern Japan
 Blue honeysuckle: descriptive translation from Russian origin
 Honeyberry: common in North America
 Swamp fly honeysuckle: coined by botanists who found it growing wild in swampy areas of Canada

Cultivation

The indigenous peoples of eastern Russia, northern Japan and northern China have long harvested the wild berries, but cultivation efforts are relatively recent, beginning in the Soviet Union in the 1950s. Research into commercial cultivation continued in Hokkaido, Japan in the 1970s. The plant is mostly unknown in the Western world, even while some varieties grow in northern Canada and northern United States. Haskap variety edulis has been used frequently in breeding efforts, but other varieties have been bred with it to increase productivity and flavor. In several haskap breeding programs, the variety emphyllocalyx has been the dominant one used.

Disease 
This plant is not affected by many pests and diseases. Powdery mildew is one disease documented to affect Lonicera caerulea, usually after fruit maturity in mid– to late summer. When the plant is affected, it is common for the leaves to turn white, with brown patches eventually developing.

Harvest and uses

Honeysuckle is harvested in late spring or early summer two weeks before strawberries for Russian type varieties, with Japanese types ripening at a similar time to strawberries. The berries are ready to harvest when the inner layer is dark purple or blue. The outer layer is dark blue and looks ripened, but the inner layer may be green with a sour flavor. Two compatible varieties are needed for cross pollination and fruit set. In North America, most Russian varieties are adapted to hardiness zones 1 to 4. The plants may take three or four years to produce an abundant harvest.

Honeysuckle can be used in various processed products, such as pastries, jams, juice, ice cream, yogurt, sauces, candies and a wine similar in color and flavor to red grape or cherry wine.

Phytochemicals

As a blue pigmented fruit, Lonicera caerulea contains polyphenol compounds, including cyanidin 3-glucoside, cyanidin 3-rutinoside, and peonidin 3-glucoside. Other phytochemicals present are proanthocyanidins and organic acids, including a high content of citric acid.

Traditional medicine
Over centuries in East Asian countries, Lonicera caerulea has been used for supposed therapeutic applications in traditional medicine.

References

caerulea
Plants described in 1753
Taxa named by Carl Linnaeus
Edible fruits
Flora of Korea